The United States Virgin Islands competed at the 1996 Summer Olympics in Atlanta, United States.

Athletics

Men
Track & road events

Women
Track & road events

Field events

Boxing

Sailing

Two sailors competed for the Virgin Islands at the Sailing venue in the Atlanta Olympics.

Men

Women

Shooting

Men

Swimming

Men

See also
 Virgin Islands at the 1995 Pan American Games

References
 Official Olympic Reports

External links
 

Nations at the 1996 Summer Olympics
1996 Summer Olympics
Olympics